Dionisio Meade y García de León is a former member of the Chamber of Deputies of Mexico and current president of the UNAM Foundation (FUNAM). In 2011 he was Director of Institutional Relations for the Bank of Mexico.

Education
He studied economics at the National Autonomous University of Mexico's (UNAM) School of Economics from 1961 to 1965. In addition, he obtained his law degree from UNAM, where he subsequently became a professor of economics, political science, and law.

Family
Meade y García de León is the son of Luis Meade Gómez, and his wife, Gracia García de León Avellaenda. He is the nephew of Lidia García de León and Alfredo de Sarachaga. He married Lucia Kuribreña Orvanos, the daughter of Daniel Kuribreña, a founder of CEN and member of PAN. They are the parents of José Antonio Meade Kuribreña.

Notes

References

1944 births
Living people
Politicians from Mexico City
Businesspeople from Mexico City
Mexican people of Irish descent
20th-century Mexican politicians
National Autonomous University of Mexico alumni
Members of the Chamber of Deputies (Mexico)